Kolpak may refer to:
 Kolpak ruling, a European Court of Justice decision involving Maros Kolpak that set a precedent about foreigners in professional sports
 an alternate spelling of kalpak, a type of hat

People with the surname
 Maros Kolpak (born 1971), a Slovak handball player
 Sydir Kovpak (1887–1967), a Soviet partisan leader in Ukraine during World War II

See also
 
Kolpik, a Hasidic fur hat